Menefessi is a former ancient city and bishopric in Tunisia. It is currently a Latin Catholic titular see.

History
Menefessi was located near modern Henchir-Djemmiah. In Roman times, it belonged to the North African Roman province of Byzacena. The city was important enough to become a suffragan bishopric, but faded.

Bishopric 
The diocese of Menefessi is a suppressed seat of the Roman Catholic Church.

There are only two documented bishops of Menefessi. 
The Catholic Mensurio who attended the Carthage conference of 411, which brought together the Catholic and Donatist bishops of Roman Africa; on that occasion Menefessi did not have any Donatist bishops. 
Servo took part in the synod gathered in Carthage by the Vandal king of Hunaric in 484, after which he was exiled.

Today Menefessi survives as a titular bishop's seat; the current titular bishop is José Trinidad González Rodríguez, former auxiliary bishop of Guadalajara. The diocese was nominally restored in 1933 as a Latin Catholic titular bishopric.

It has had the following incumbents, both of the lowest (episcopal) and intermediary (archiepiscopal) ranks :
 Titular Bishop Ignatius John Doggett, Friars Minor (O.F.M.) (1969.06.06 – 1976.07.07)
 Titular Archbishop Frédéric Etsou-Nzabi-Bamungwabi, Scheutists (C.I.C.M.) (1976.07.08 – 1977.11.11), later Cardinal-Priest of Santa Lucia a Piazza d’Armi (1991.06.28 – 2007.01.06)
 Titular Bishop István Ács, Pauline Fathers (O.S.P.P.E.) (1988.12.23 – 1993.03.27)
 Titular Bishop José Trinidad González Rodríguez (1997.02.21 – ...), Auxiliary Bishop-emeritus of Guadalajara

References

External links 
 GigaCatholic with titular incumbent biography links

Catholic titular sees in Africa
Former Roman Catholic dioceses in Africa